Richard Wolsztynski (born 18 April 1948 in Saint-Avold, Moselle) is a retired French general officer.  He was Chief of Staff of the French Air Force from 2002 to 2006.

References

1948 births
Living people
French Air Force generals
Chiefs of the Staff of the French Air and Space Force
Grand Officiers of the Légion d'honneur